David Westlake is an English singer/songwriter. He led indie band The Servants from 1985 to 1991.

History
Westlake formed indie band the Servants in 1985 in Hayes, Middlesex, England.

The Servants appeared on 1986’s NME-associated C86 compilation, and the band was from 1986 to 1991 the original home of Luke Haines.

Haines describes David Westlake’s first solo album, 1987’s Westlake (Creation Records), as “a minor classic”.

In 2002, Westlake released self-pressed album Play Dusty for Me (Mahlerphone) in a limited issue that quickly sold out. Play Dusty for Me was reissued in 2010 and 2015.

Tiny Global Productions released Westlake’s album My Beautiful England in 2022.

The Servants
The Servants' Small Time album was well received on its 2012 Cherry Red Records release, more than twenty years after its 1991-recording. The belated release followed the inclusion of 1990’s Disinterest in Mojo magazine’s 2011 list of the greatest British indie records of all time.

Westlake and Haines played together for the first time in twenty-three years at the Lexington, London N1 on 4 May 2014. Westlake and band played at an NME C86 show on 14 June 2014 at Venue 229, London W1; the show marked Cherry Red Records’ expanded reissue of C86.

As chronicled in an interview in US music magazine The Big Takeover (issue 53, 2004), Belle and Sebastian frontman Stuart Murdoch was a huge Westlake fan and tried to locate him in the early 1990s in hope of forming a band with him, before launching Belle and Sebastian in his school class instead.

David Westlake is a solicitor and academic.

Discography

Albums
Solo
 Westlake (Nov 1987, Creation Records, CRELP019 [LP]; reissued on CD by Sony in August 1993)
 Play Dusty for Me (Jun 2002, Mahlerphone, CDA 001 [CD]; reissued Jul 2010 & Nov 2015)
 My Beautiful England (Aug 2022, Tiny Global Productions, PAPLP005 [LP]/PAPCD005 [CD])

with The Servants
 Disinterest (Jul 1990, Paperhouse Records, PAPLP005 [LP]/PAPCD005 [CD])
 Reserved (compilation; Mar 2006, Cherry Red Records, CDMRED297 [CD]; reissued in reduced form as Youth Club Disco, Jul 2011)
 Small Time/Hey Hey We're the Manqués (Oct 2012, Cherry Red Records, CDB RED 535 [2CD]; reissued Dec 2013)

Singles
with the Servants
 “She’s Always Hiding”/“Transparent” (Mar 1986, Head Records, HEAD1 [7"])
 “The Sun, a Small Star”/“Meredith”/“It Takes No Gentleman”/“Funny Business” (Oct 1986, Head Records, HEAD3 [12"])
 “It’s My Turn”/“Afterglow” (Sep 1989, Glass Records, GLASS056 [7"])
 “It’s My Turn”/“Afterglow”/“Faithful to 3 Lovers”/“Do or Be Done” (Sep 1989, Glass Records, GLASS12 056 [12"])
 “Look Like a Girl”/“Bad Habits Die Hard” (Aug 1990, Paperhouse Records, PAPER004 [7"])

References

External links
 Derek Sozou, David Westlake site
 Luke Haines, Bad Vibes (London: William Heinemann, 2009), 5-10.
 Luke Haines, sleevenotes to the Servants’ compilation Reserved (Cherry Red Records CDMRED 297, 2006)
 Luke Haines, sleevenotes to the Servants’ album Small Time (Cherry Red Records CDB RED 535, 2012)
 Jack Rabid, review of David Westlake’s album Play Dusty For Me in The Big Takeover, 17 Jan 2011
 John Peel session information
 Janice Long session information
 PhD

1965 births
People from Hayes, Hillingdon
English male singer-songwriters
English male guitarists
English rock guitarists
Musicians from London
Living people